Palghar railway station (station code: PLG) is a railway station on the Western Railway line of Mumbai Suburban Railway.

Palghar is the headquarters of the Palghar district in India's Maharashtra state, which comes under the Mumbai metropolitan region. Palghar is well served with EMU (Mumbai Locals) and MEMU trains, which provide direct connectivity to various parts of Mumbai, Thane and Panvel. Many long-distance trains also stop at Palghar.

Major trains

The following trains stop at Palghar railway station:

 Bandra Terminus–Dehradun Express
 Bandra Terminus–Bhusaval Khandesh Express
 Bandra Terminus–Jamnagar Saurashtra Janta Express
 Bandra Terminus–Ahmedabad Lok Shakti Superfast Express
 Mumbai Central–Okha Saurashtra Mail
 Mumbai Central–Ahmedabad Gujarat Mail
 Mumbai Central–Firozpur Janata Express
 Bikaner–Bandra Terminus Ranakpur Express
 Mumbai Central–Surat Flying Ranee Superfast Express
 Kochuveli–Porbandar Express
 Kochuveli–Dehradun Superfast Express
 Saurashtra Express
 Gujarat Superfast Express
 Jaipur–Bandra Terminus Superfast Express
 Indore–Pune Express (via Panvel)
 Chennai–Ahmedabad Humsafar Express
 Bandra Terminus–Udaipur Express
 Swaraj Express
 Mysore–Ajmer Express

Gallery

References 

Railway stations in Palghar district
Mumbai Suburban Railway stations
Mumbai WR railway division
Transport in Palghar